Parmops echinatus is a species of flashlight fish, order Beryciformes, found in the western Pacific Ocean.

References

External links
 

Anomalopidae
Fish described in 2001
Fish of the Pacific Ocean